Stephen Lord (born 1 October 1971) is an English actor, known for playing Jase Dyer in the BBC soap opera EastEnders from 2007 to 2008 and Dominic Meak in the Channel 4 comedy drama series, Shameless, between 2012 and 2013. In 2021, he was cast in the ITV soap opera Coronation Street.

Personal life 
Lord is married to Elaine Cassidy and the couple have two children.

Career
The BBC defended the use of violent scenes in an edition of EastEnders. In the episode, Lord's character Jase Dyer was seen losing his life following a confrontation with a group of gangsters who stabbed him after brutally beating him up. Later, the character's dead body was seen by viewers in hospital scenes which featured Jase's son Jay Brown, played by Jamie Borthwick. Lord appeared in the BBC drama series Casualty in 2010-11 playing the abusive husband of nurse Kirsty Clements (played by Lucy Gaskell) in an ongoing storyline dealing with domestic violence. In 2021, Lord was cast in the ITV soap opera Coronation Street as Tez Wyatt.

Filmography

References

External links
 

Living people
1972 births
English male soap opera actors
Male actors from Salford
20th-century English male actors
21st-century English male actors